The Wupatki National Monument is a United States National Monument located in north-central Arizona, near Flagstaff. Rich in Native American archaeological sites, the monument is administered by the National Park Service in close conjunction with the nearby Sunset Crater Volcano National Monument. Wupatki was established as a national monument in 1924 and was listed on the National Register of Historic Places on October 15, 1966.

History
The many settlement sites scattered throughout the monument were built by the Ancient Pueblo People, more specifically the Cohonina, Kayenta, and Sinagua. Wupatki, which means "Long Cut House" in the Hopi language, is a multistory pueblo dwelling comprising over 100 rooms and a community room and the northernmost ballcourt ever discovered in North America, creating the largest building site for nearly 50 miles. Nearby secondary structures have also been uncovered, including two kiva-like structures.  A major population influx began soon after the eruption of Sunset Crater in the 11th century (between 1040 and 1100), which blanketed the area with volcanic ash, improving agricultural productivity and the soil's ability to retain water. By 1182, approximately 85 to 100 people lived at Wupatki Pueblo, but by 1225, the site was permanently abandoned. Based on a careful survey of archaeological sites conducted in the 1980s, an estimated 2,000 people moved into the area during the century following the eruption. Agriculture was based mainly on maize and squash raised on the arid land without irrigation. In the Wupatki site, the residents harvested rainwater due to the rarity of springs.

The dwelling's walls were constructed from thin, flat blocks of the local Moenkopi sandstone, giving the pueblos their distinct red color. Held together with mortar, many of the walls still stand. Each settlement was constructed as a single building, sometimes with scores of rooms. The largest settlement on monument territory is the Wupatki Pueblo, built around a natural rock outcrop. With more than 100 rooms, this pueblo is believed to be the region's tallest and largest structure for its time period. The monument also contains structures identified as a ball court, similar to those found in Mesoamerica and in the Hohokam sites of southern Arizona; this is the northernmost example of this kind of structure. This site also contains a geological blowhole, from which wind escapes from a cave system. Other major sites are Wukoki and The Citadel.

Today, Wupatki appears empty and abandoned, but it is remembered and cared for. Although it is no longer physically occupied, Hopi believe the people who lived and died here remain as spiritual guardians. Stories of Wupatki are passed on among Hopi, Navajo, Zuni, and other Native American tribes in the region. Members of the Hopi Bear, Katsina, Lizard, Rattlesnake, Sand, Snow, and Water Clans return periodically to enrich their personal understanding of their clan history.

Amidst what would seem a generally inhospitable area due to the lack of food and water sources, several artifacts have been located at the site from distant locations, implying that the people who inhabited Wupatki were involved in trade. During numerous excavations stretching back to the site' exploration in the mid-1800s, items from as far as the Pacific and the Gulf Coasts have been located at the site, such as many different varieties of pottery and seashells.

Climate
Wupatki has a dry climate, classified by the Köppen climate classification system as a borderline semi-arid climate and arid climate (BSk/BWk). Wupatki has cold winters and hot summers.

See also
 List of national monuments of the United States

References

External links

 
 NPS: official Wupatki National Monument website
 American Southwest, National Park Service Discover Our Shared Heritage Travel Itinerary
 Anthropology Laboratories of Northern Arizona University
 
 
 
 
 

National Park Service National Monuments in Arizona
Archaeological sites in Arizona
Parks in Coconino County, Arizona
Puebloan buildings and structures
Museums in Coconino County, Arizona
Native American museums in Arizona
Native American history of Arizona
Archaeological sites on the National Register of Historic Places in Arizona
National Register of Historic Places in Coconino County, Arizona
Blowholes
Former populated places in Arizona
Historic American Buildings Survey in Arizona
1924 establishments in Arizona
Protected areas established in 1924
11th century in North America
Buildings and structures completed in the 11th century
Ruins in the United States
Former populated places in Coconino County, Arizona
Sinagua